This sortable list contains all nature reserves in Mecklenburg-Western Pomerania, Germany (as of 31 December 2010). The serial numbers are those officially designated.

Footnotes

Literature 
 Umweltministerium Mecklenburg-Vorpommern (Hrsg.): Die nature reserves in Mecklenburg-Vorpommern. Demmler-Verlag, Schwerin 2003,

External links 

 Landesamt für Umwelt, Naturschutz and Geologie Mecklenburg-Vorpommern
 Übersichtskarte: kleine Version (DIN-A3, ohne NSG-Nummer, PDF, 1,7 MB) and große Version (DIN-A0, mit NSG-Nummer, PDF, 5,3 MB)

 
!List of nature reserves in Mecklenburg-Vorpommern